Kew is a suburb of Melbourne, Victoria, Australia, 5 km east from Melbourne's Central Business District, located within the City of Boroondara local government area. Kew recorded a population of 24,499 at the 2021 census.

A city in its own right from 1860 to 1994, Kew was amalgamated with the cities of Hawthorn and Camberwell to form the City of Boroondara. The suburb borders the Yarra River to the west and northwest, with Kew East to the northeast, Hawthorn and Hawthorn East to its south, and with Balwyn, Balwyn North and Deepdene to the east.

History
Prior to the establishment of Melbourne, the area was inhabited by the Wurundjeri peoples. In the 1840s European settlers named it the Parish of Boroondara – meaning "a place of shade" in the Woiwurrung language. In 1838 Dight travelled down the Yarra from Heidelberg and decided to locate a water-powered mill on a site adjacent to Dights Falls; the impressive three-storey mill opened in 1840.

John Hodgson established a squatters run at Studley Park, on the eastern bank of the Yarra River, in 1840. Studley House, also known as Burke Hall, built in 1857, was named after Hodgson's birthplace of Studley, Yorkshire and the house is now on the Register of the National Estate. The house was built in the Victorian Period Italianate Revival style. Modifications were made to the house in 1875 and 1919. The house was also owned by former bookmaker, ALP lobbyist, influential Irish-Catholic and millionaire, John Wren and was donated to Xavier College by the land developer, Thomas Burke. It illustrates the importance of a residence in indicating success and status in nineteenth- and early-twentieth-century Melbourne society. The nearby Villa Alba, built before 1863, is open to the public.

In 1851, Crown land sales occurred in the area. One of the purchasers, Nicholas Fenwick, subdivided his land (which was just further out from the centre of the colony of Melbourne than the area known as Richmond) and named the region Kew, based on the thought that Kew in England was near Richmond. He also notably named its streets after British statesmen. The area quickly became a sought-after suburb for the well-to-do in Melbourne. Access to Kew was originally via Bridge Road in Richmond, crossing the Hawthorn Bridge to Burwood Road, until the privately owned Studley Park Bridge (nicknamed the Penny Bridge) opened in 1857, connecting Church Street Richmond with Studley Park.

The commercial precinct known as Kew Junction began to take shape in the 1850s. The first store was opened by Mr. J. J. French in August 1853 and the first post office on 6 October 1856, however, it was not till towards the end of the decade that many shops appeared in High Street. The Kew Hotel opened in 1855, the Prospect Hill Hotel (now the Dan Murphy's liquor store) in 1857, the Council Hotel about 1860, the Clifton (now Hotel Kew) in 1869 and the Greyhound (now the Skinny Dog Hotel) in 1874. The block of civic buildings comprising the former post office, the former court house and the former police station were built in 1888 as was the National Bank, at the corner of Walpole and High Streets.

In 1856, a site was reserved for a mental asylum next to the river. By 1871 Kew Lunatic Asylum, now known as Willsmere Estate, was completed. The Kew Cottages for children were added in 1887. The hospital was built despite objections by residents and the Kew Borough Council and provides an historical example of nimbyism. Kew Cottages and Willsmere Hospital are listed on the Victorian Heritage Register.

Various churches opened in the 1850s, with the first school opened by the Anglican Church in 1856. In 1875 Sacred Heart Primary School was opened. More private schools were opened in 1878, including Ruyton Girls' School (non-denominational) and Xavier College (Catholic in Jesuit order). Other private schools soon followed, including Methodist Ladies' College (Uniting Church in Australia) in 1882, Genazzano FCJ College in 1889, Trinity Grammar School (Anglican) in 1903, and Carey Baptist Grammar School (Baptist) in 1923. Preshil, The Margaret Lyttle Memorial School, was opened in the early 1930s. In 1960 it was said: "it would be difficult to find any locality so richly endowed with so many and such large educational institutions as are to be found in Kew."

A railway branch line to Kew from Hawthorn Station opened on 19 December 1887 and was officially closed on 13 May 1957. Kew was proclaimed a town on 8 December 1910, and a city on 10 March 1921. The population of the area tripled between 1910 and World War II.

A former house in Kew was the birthplace of the 21st Prime Minister of Australia, Gough Whitlam. As of 2016, due to its demolition, the house no longer exists.

Raheen
Raheen is a historic 19th-century Italianate mansion, located at 92 Studley Park Road. It was built in the 1870s, and its name means "little fort" in Irish.

Raheen was once the residence of Daniel Mannix, the former Catholic Archbishop of Melbourne and was purchased by the Catholic Church in 1917 with support from John Wren.

It was purchased in 1980 by the Australian businessman Richard Pratt and his family and is not currently open to the public. Pratt extensively renovated the house and gardens, including the addition of a new wing, designed by Glen Murcutt.

Today
Kew has grown steadily since the early Bridge Road crossing development and is cited as one of the most prestigious suburbs in Melbourne. As a consequence, many of these residences now attract some of the highest residential resale values in Melbourne.

Streets in the Sackville Ward (bounded by Barkers, Burke, Cotham and Glenferrie Roads), such as Alfred, Rowland, Wellington, Grange and Sackville, have some exceptional examples of Edwardian, Victorian and contemporary architecture.

The suburb has been home to numerous Scout Groups since 1st Kew was formed in 1909. Today, only 1st Kew and 4th Kew are in operation.

Kew has convenient access to public facilities and transport. The 109, 16 and 72 along with tram route 48 (North Balwyn – Victoria Harbour Docklands) tram routes pass through the suburb and the City/Lilydale/Belgrave train line is easily accessed at Hawthorn and Glenferrie Stations. Kew Station and the associated railway branch was last served by passenger trains in 1952, with the station site now the headquarters of VicRoads.

Demographics

In the 2021 Census, there were 24,499 people in Kew. 66.1% of people were born in Australia. The next most common countries of birth were China 6.6%, England 2.9%, Malaysia 2.2%, India 1.8% and New Zealand 1.4%. 70.3% of people spoke only English at home. Other languages spoken at home included Mandarin 8.6%, Greek 3.0%, Cantonese 2.8%, Italian 1.7% and Vietnamese 1.4%. The most common responses for religion were No Religion 44.1% and Catholic 22.7%.

Education
 Kew Primary School
 Sacred Heart Primary School
 Carey Baptist Grammar School
 Genazzano FCJ College
 Methodist Ladies' College
 Preshil
 Ruyton Girls' School
 Trinity Grammar School
 Xavier College
 Kew High School

Sport

Golfers have the choice of membership at Green Acres Golf Club, or Kew Golf Club, in Kew East, or may play at the Studley Park Par 3 Golf Course, on Studley Park Road.

Kew Football Club and Kew Cricket Club play out of Victoria Park, on High Street.

Notable people

 Cecil Austen – footballer
 Jack Billings-AFL footballer
 Philip Brady - 3AW radio personality
 MacFarlane Burnet – virologist and Nobel Laureate
 Irene Crespin – Geologist
 Peter Curran – footballer
 Robert DiPierdomenico – footballer
 Jack Gervasoni – footballer and Mayor of Kew
 Rupert Hamer – Premier of Victoria
 Terrence Hodson - Murdered Police Informant and Drug Dealer
 Walter Reginald Hume – businessman and inventor
 Michael Klinger – cricketer
 Kyrie Irving – NBA basketballer for the Brooklyn Nets
 Graham Kinniburgh – Australian organised crime figure
 Brian V. Johnstone - theologian
 Peter MacCallum – pathologist
 Jack Macrae - AFL footballer
 Glenn Maxwell – cricketer
 Luke McDonald (footballer) - AFL footballer
 Peter McIntyre (architect) – architect
 Clement Roy Nichols – Scouting 
 Gustav Nossal – scientist and Australian of the Year
 Phil Ryan (footballer born 1915) – footballer
 Wendy Smith (politician) – politician
 Ross Stevenson- 3AW radio presenter
 David Syme – owner of The Age and associated newspapers
 Frank T. M. White - mineral science educator
 Gough Whitlam – 21st Prime Minister of Australia born at 'Ngara' 46 Rowland St.
 John Wren – businessman
 Josh Frydenberg- politician
 Phil Anderson (cyclist)
 Jack Sinclair- AFL footballer-played junior football for Kew Comets
 Andrew Gaff-AFL footballer-played junior football for Kew Comets
 Cathy Freeman

See also
 City of Kew – Kew was previously within this former local government area.
 Electoral district of Kew - The state electoral division in which encompasses the suburb of Kew.
 Division of Kooyong- The federal electoral division in which encompasses the suburb of Kew.
 City of Boroondara - The local government council in which encompasses the suburb of Kew.

References

  (via Internet Archive)

Bibliography
 Rogers, Dorothy. "A History of Kew". Kilmore, Victoria:Lowden Publishing Co. 1973. .
 Vaughan, W.D. "Kew's Civic Century" . Kew, Victoria, W.D.Vaughan Pty Ltd, First Edition 1960.

External links 
 

Suburbs of Melbourne
1838 establishments in Australia
Suburbs of the City of Boroondara